Bertille St. Clair is a Trinidadian football manager who has coached the national teams of both Saint Vincent and the Grenadines and Trinidad and Tobago.

He was in charge of Trinidad and Tobago at the Gold Cup in 1998 and 2000.

References

Year of birth missing (living people)
Living people
Trinidad and Tobago football managers
Trinidad and Tobago expatriate football managers
Expatriate football managers in Saint Vincent and the Grenadines
Trinidad and Tobago expatriate sportspeople in Saint Vincent and the Grenadines
Saint Vincent and the Grenadines national football team managers
Trinidad and Tobago national football team managers